Georg Emil Libert (2 August 1820 – 19 May 1908) was a Danish landscape painter. His specialties included scenes featuring Danish, German and Norwegian  landscapes.

Biography
Libert  was born in Copenhagen, Denmark. He was the son of Johan Christian Libert (1790-1846) and his first wife, Andrea Margrethe Hassing (1796-1820). His father was a  cabinetmaker. 

He was a graduate of the Royal Academy in Copenhagen where he studied under Johan Ludwig Lund (1777– 1867).
In 1845, he applied for travel support from the Academy, which was awarded to him in 1846 with renewed scholarship in 1847.
He stayed abroad from 1857 to 1859, especially in Germany and Switzerland.
He sought inspiration, especially from the Munich landscape sctyene.

He exhibited many works in Charlottenborg and at the Kunstforeningen  (Art Association). He is best known for his paintings of the Baltic island of Bornholm; indeed one of the cliffs at Helligdomsklipperne,  Libert's Rock (Libertsklippen) is named after him.

Many of his works today are in the Danish National Gallery and Thorvaldsens Museum, and are highly sought after by buyers; his painting Ansicht des Heidelberger Schlosses Zwischen der Molkenkur, der Stadt (1859) sold for $11,240 at Sotheby's in Munich in June 1994.

Personal life
In 1852, he married Marie Philippine Caroline Busch (1830-1904). Georg Libert died during 1908  in Copenhagen and was buried at the Cemetery of Holmen.

Gallery

References

External links

Danish landscape painters
1820 births
1908 deaths
Artists from Copenhagen
19th-century Danish painters
Danish male painters
20th-century Danish painters
Burials at Holmen Cemetery
19th-century Danish male artists
20th-century Danish male artists